Bobby Joe McCreary (born June 20, 1939) is a former American football offensive tackle in the National Football League (NFL) for the Dallas Cowboys. He also was a member of the Calgary Stampeders in the Canadian Football League (CFL). He played college football at Wake Forest University.

Early years
McCreary attended Hudson High School in Hudson, North Carolina. Although he never played football before his freshman season, he developed into an honorable-mention All-state football player as a senior. He also played basketball.

McCreary accepted a football scholarship from Wake Forest University. After sustaining a career-threatening knee injury as a freshman in 1958 (torn medial collateral ligament), he recovered to become a two-way tackle.

Professional career

San Francisco 49ers
McCreary was selected by the San Francisco 49ers in the fifth round (65th overall) of the 1961 NFL Draft. He was waived on September 4.

Dallas Cowboys
On September 6, 1961, McCreary was signed by the Dallas Cowboys. He began the season on the taxi squad, before being promoted to the active roster on October 20. McCreary appeared in nine games, with four starts at right tackle. He was released on September 3, 1962.

Calgary Stampeders (CFL)
In 1963, McCreary was signed by the Calgary Stampeders of the CFL.

Personal life
After retiring from professional football, McCreary worked for twenty years in sales in the furniture industry, before starting his own home-furnishing business, McCreary Modern in 1986.

In 2008, he received the Gene Hooks Achievement Award from the Wake Forest Varsity Club.

In 2013, McCreary was inducted into the Wake Forest Sports Hall of Fame. McCreary has also been inducted into the Caldwell County Sports Hall of Fame.

In 2014, McCreary committed $7.5 million to Wake Forest University football's indoor practice facility project. The facility was declared to be named in honor of McCreary. The plaza outside gate 1 at Truist Field and video board inside the stadium are also named for McCreary, as is the strength and conditioning center.

References

External links
The Man Behind the Name

1939 births
Living people
People from Lenoir, North Carolina
Players of American football from North Carolina
American football offensive tackles
Wake Forest Demon Deacons football players
Dallas Cowboys players
Calgary Stampeders players